Indium arsenide, InAs, or indium monoarsenide, is a narrow-bandgap semiconductor composed of indium and arsenic. It has the appearance of grey cubic crystals with a melting point of 942 °C.

Indium arsenide is similar in properties to gallium arsenide and is a direct bandgap material, with a bandgap of 0.35 eV at room temperature.

Indium arsenide is used for the construction of infrared detectors, for the wavelength range of 1.0–3.8 µm. The detectors are usually photovoltaic photodiodes. Cryogenically cooled detectors have lower noise, but InAs detectors can be used in higher-power applications at room temperature as well. Indium arsenide is also used for making diode lasers.

InAs are well known for their high electron mobility and narrow energy bandgap. It is widely used as a terahertz radiation source as it is a strong photo-Dember emitter.

Quantum dots can be formed in a monolayer of indium arsenide on indium phosphide or gallium arsenide. The mismatches of lattice constants of the materials create tensions in the surface layer, which in turn leads to the formation of the quantum dots. Quantum dots can also be formed in indium gallium arsenide, as indium arsenide dots sitting in the gallium arsenide matrix.

References

Cited sources

External links
 Ioffe institute data archive entry
 National Compound Semiconductor Roadmap entry for InAs at ONR web site

Arsenides
Indium compounds
III-V semiconductors
III-V compounds
Zincblende crystal structure